Villa Baizeau is a residential home in the Carthage Palace, Tunis, Tunisia designed by Swiss modernist architect Le Corbusier in 1928. The building is the only work in Tunisia by the architect.

Le Corbusier designed the entire project remotely; neither he nor any member of his staff visited the site before, during, or following construction of the building.

References 

Le Corbusier buildings
Buildings and structures in Tunis